In Fear is a 2013 British psychological horror film written and directed by Jeremy Lovering, loosely based on the 2009 short film and web series No Through Road by Steven Chamberlain. The movie premiered on 20 January 2013 at the Sundance Film Festival. It stars Iain De Caestecker and Alice Englert as a young couple terrorised by an unknown assailant.

Plot
After dating for just two weeks, Tom (Iain De Caestecker) invites  Lucy (Alice Englert) to go with him and some friends to a festival. The night before, Tom plans to take Lucy to the Kilairney House Hotel, which he booked online and is hidden away on a series of remote roads in the Irish countryside. Before making their way to the hotel, the couple stop at a pub and a confrontation occurs between Tom and some of the locals.

On the empty back road to the hotel, Tom and Lucy find themselves going in circles despite following the signs and their satnav stops working. They eventually realise that they keep returning to the same point no matter which route they take and are unable to find their way back to the main road. Strange things begin happening, including Lucy spotting a man in a white mask and someone attempting to grab her from the darkness.

While speeding down the road away from their attacker, Tom clips a man in the road. He and Lucy pick up the man, who says his name is Max (Allen Leech). Max claims to be under attack by the same people stalking the couple. However, he is eventually revealed to be the true culprit, apparently able to manipulate the reality of the roads. Tom kicks Max out of the car following a harrowing confrontation and Max breaks Tom’s wrist in a subsequent fight.

Lucy and Tom take their torches to hide in the woods from him when their car runs out of petrol. In the darkness Tom is grabbed and disappears. Lucy returns to the car alone and finds a petrol can in the front seat. After refilling the tank and with the satnav now mysteriously working again, Lucy drives on and eventually finds the hotel, but discovers that it is abandoned. The car park is a graveyard of derelict cars, suggesting that she and Tom are not the first victims.

Max returns in a Land Rover and pursues Lucy. When Lucy is able to stop the car, she finds a tube running from the exhaust pipe into the boot. She opens the boot and discovers Tom bound inside, dead from carbon monoxide poisoning from the tube forced into his throat.

As day breaks, Lucy finds the way back to the main road, but as she drives over a lonely moor towards it she sees Max standing in road in the distance. Max stretches out his arms and smiles at her. Lucy slams her foot on the pedal and accelerates towards Max.

Cast
Iain De Caestecker as Tom
Alice Englert as Lucy
Allen Leech as Max

Production 
Although set in the Irish countryside, In Fear was filmed on and around Bodmin Moor in Cornwall and at Blackborough House in Devon.

Actors Alice Englert and Iain De Caestacker were not told what would happen to their characters during filming, other than the basic setup of the story, à la the original No Through Road series, with many of their shocked reactions therefore being genuine and not acted. The film was also shot in sequence to better achieve this.

Soundtrack 
Alice Englert performs the song Conversation With Death that plays over the end credits.

Reception
Critical reception has been mostly positive. , the film holds an 84% approval rating on Rotten Tomatoes, based on 58 reviews with an average rating of 6.73 out of 10. The website's critics consensus reads: "Compact and effective, In Fear offers discerning horror fans a smart and disturbing plunge into the depths of cinematic anxiety." It has a score of 66 on Metacritic, based on 14 reviews indicating "generally favorable reviews". Much of the film's praise centered around the camerawork, and The Hollywood Reporter commented that "Lovering's camera setups turn an already tight car into an increasingly claustrophobic setting". Empire gave a mixed review for In Fear, remarking that it had "atmosphere and enough proper scares to deliver on the promise of its title" but that it was also "contrived and nothing new plot-wise".

References

External links
 
 

2013 films
2013 horror films
2013 horror thriller films
2010s psychological horror films
2013 psychological thriller films
Big Talk Productions films
British horror thriller films
British psychological thriller films
Films about couples
Films set in Ireland
Films set in the 21st century
Films shot in Cornwall
Films shot in Devon
Films scored by Daniel Pemberton
2010s English-language films
2010s British films